Steven T. Street is a Democratic member of the South Dakota House of Representatives, representing District 4 since 2005.

External links
South Dakota Legislature – Steve Street official SD House website

Project Vote Smart – Representative Steve Street (SD) profile
Follow the Money – Steve Street
2008 2006 2004 campaign contributions

Democratic Party members of the South Dakota House of Representatives
1950 births
Living people
South Dakota State University alumni
People from Grant County, South Dakota
Farmers from South Dakota
People from Ortonville, Minnesota